Herbert Nankiville (born 7 June 1917 in East Coolgardie – 6 June 1977 in Lancelin) was a champion swimmer who won the Australian national 440 yards freestyle championship in 1936. He was inducted into the Goldfields Sporting Hall of Fame in Kalgoorlie, Western Australia, where he also has a road, Nankiville Road, named after him.

References

Australian male freestyle swimmers
1977 deaths
1917 births
People from Coolgardie, Western Australia